Dear Jack is a 2009 American documentary film starring Andrew McMahon,  the vocalist, pianist and primary songwriter for the bands Something Corporate and Jack's Mannequin.  The documentary chronicles McMahon on a rollercoaster year, through the highs of recording and releasing a solo album and the lows of being diagnosed with leukemia and breaking up with his girlfriend.

Synopsis
On May 27, 2005, McMahon was forced to cancel all of his upcoming concerts  after a medical examination in connection with a relentless case of laryngitis forced him into being admitted into a hospital in New York City. On June 1, 2005, he was diagnosed with acute lymphoblastic leukemia, the same day he finished recording his debut album under the Jack's Mannequin moniker, Everything in Transit. Since the illness was diagnosed in its early stages, McMahon's doctors had high hopes for a full recovery.

Using a handheld video camera that his record label gave to him initially to document the process of recording his album, McMahon recorded everything from inside his hospital room and onward, from spinal taps to radiation and commentary on his deteriorating physical and mental state. The film follows him from diagnoses to recovery, including the stem cell transplant that saved his life and the first show he performed after being well again.

References

2009 films
2009 documentary films
American documentary films
Documentary films about cancer
Films shot in California
Documentary films about rock music and musicians
2000s English-language films
2000s American films